Heli Holland is a Dutch helicopter operator. Services provided include VIP transport, offshore transport, flight training, aerial photography, medical flights, freight transport and aerial inspection flights. It also performs helicopter maintenance and trading. Operating bases are Lelystad Airport, Amsterdam Heliport and a company owned heliport in Emmer Compascuum, which is also the location of the company's head office. It is the largest helicopter operator in the Netherlands.

Fleet
Fleet as per December 2008:
Cessna 402B (1x)
Airbus H175 (1x)
Eurocopter EC 155 (2x)
Eurocopter EC 130 (1x)
Eurocopter EC 120 (6x)
Eurocopter AS355 (3x)
Bell 206 Long Ranger (1x)
Bell 206 Jet Ranger (1x)
Schweizer / Hughes 300 (3x)
Schweizer 330 (2x)

Accident
On 27 June 2010 a Eurocopter EC 130 operated by Heli Holland crashed in the Maasvlakte in Rotterdam, killing four of the five people on board and badly injuring the remaining occupant. Three of the passengers were photographers capturing the Tour du Port amateur cycling event, which was organized in anticipation of the start of the 2010 Tour de France in the Netherlands a week later. The cause of the crash could not be determined with certainty.

References

External links
Heli Holland - official website

Airlines of the Netherlands
Airlines established in 1976
Helicopter airlines